Terence James O'Neill, Baron O'Neill of Gatley (born 17 March 1957) is a British economist best known for coining BRICs, the acronym that stands for Brazil, Russia, India, and China—the four once rapidly developing countries that were thought to challenge the global economic power of the developed G7 economies. He is also a former chairman of Goldman Sachs Asset Management and former Conservative government minister. As of January 2014, he is an Honorary Professor of Economics at the University of Manchester. He was appointed Commercial Secretary to the Treasury in the Second Cameron Ministry, a position he held until his resignation on 23 September 2016. He chaired the UK's Independent Review into Antimicrobial Resistance for two years, which completed its work in May 2016. Since 2008, he has written monthly columns for international media organization Project Syndicate. He is the current chairman of the Council of Chatham House, the Royal Institute of International Affairs.

Career
O'Neill obtained a Bachelor of Arts (BA) degree in 1977 and a Master of Arts (MA) degree in economics from Sheffield University in 1978. He subsequently earned his PhD degree from the University of Surrey in 1982, with a thesis titled An empirical investigation into the OPEC surplus and its disposal. O'Neill began his career in finance working at Bank of America in 1982. In 1985 he joined Marine Midland Bank as Economist for their International Treasury Management Division. After Marine Midland was purchased by HSBC he joined Swiss Bank Corporation in 1988 where he was in charge of the fixed income research group, and he served as SBC's chief of global research. He joined Goldman Sachs in 1997 and he was appointed as the head of global economics research in 2001, which is also when he published the seminal BRIC paper. Jan Hatzius replaced O'Neill as chief economist after O'Neill moved to Goldman Sachs Asset Management.

In 2010, he was named chairman of Goldman Sachs's Division of Asset Management, a newly created position in which O'Neill managed over $800 billion in assets by "leverag[ing]" his "global perspective on world markets". He continues to publish research regarding the global economy, in addition to coming up with innovative investment strategies for clients. His new appointment was regarded as a symbol of Goldman's "efforts to reposition itself for Wall Street's post-crisis era", one in which Goldman Sachs is "bullish" about the fact that emerging markets are "the future". In 2011, he was included in the 50 Most Influential ranking of Bloomberg Markets magazine.

He retired from the firm in 2013. He is a currently on the International Advisory Board of the Centre for Rising Powers at the University of Cambridge. O'Neill sits on the QFINANCE Strategic Advisory Board. He is also a member of the board of Bruegel, the European think tank for international economics. O'Neill is chairman of the Greater Manchester Local Enterprise Partnership Advisory Board, which advises on the growth of the Greater Manchester economy. On 2 July 2014, he was appointed by UK Prime Minister David Cameron to head an international commission to investigate global antimicrobial resistance. In 2014, O'Neill was awarded an Honorary Litt.D. degree by the University of Sheffield in recognition of his contribution to international economics. He has honorary degrees from the Institute of Education of the University of London, for his educational philanthropy, and from City University London for his services to banking and finance.

In 2018, Lord O'Neill published the book Superbugs: an Arms Race Against Bacteria co-written with Anthony McDonnell and Will Hall, which tells the story of drug resistant infections and outlines the policy interventions he believes necessary to stop them.

House of Lords
In 2015, he was created a Life Peer as Baron O'Neill of Gatley, of Gatley in the County of Greater Manchester, and took up an unpaid post in HM Government as the Commercial Secretary to the Treasury. In this role O'Neill's primary role was to work on the Northern Powerhouse project and to help reinvigorate trade with China. Following the resignation of David Cameron as Prime Minister his successor, Theresa May, kept O'Neill in post. In 2016, O'Neill resigned over concerns that May was not committed to the Northern Powerhouse project, making him the first member of May's ministry to resign. 

O'Neill sat in the House of Lords as a Conservative life peer from 28 May 2015 to 23 September 2016. After leaving the Conservatives, he then sat as a non-affiliated member of the House of Lords 23 September 2016 to 9 October 2017, and he has sat as a member of the crossbenchers since 9 October 2017.

Economic views
O'Neill claims not to commit to a specific financial ideology; instead, he is known for his "pragmatic, long-term" vision of currency markets. He improves upon traditional models of data analysis by incorporating elements that ultimately make them more accurate.

BRICs
O'Neill coined the term "BRIC" in 2001 in "The World Needs Better Economic BRICs", a paper written for Goldman Sachs's "Global Economic Paper" series, on the four emerging "BRIC" economies Brazil, Russia, India, and China.

Foreign exchange markets
O'Neill has been called a "currency guru"; he has been hailed as "the top foreign-exchange economist anywhere in the world in the past decade". For example, in 2004 he accurately predicted that the euro would rise from $1.25 to $1.30 a year later; he was also right about the yen's rise in the mid-1990s. He was previously head of global economic research and commodities and strategy research at Goldman Sachs.

Next Eleven
The Next Eleven (known also by the numeronym N-11) are the eleven countries – Bangladesh, Egypt, Indonesia, Iran, Mexico, Nigeria, Pakistan, the Philippines, South Korea, Turkey, and Vietnam – identified by Jim O'Neill in a research paper as having a high potential of becoming, along with the BRICS countries, among the world's largest economies in the 21st century. The bank chose these states, all with promising outlooks for investment and future growth, on 12 December 2005.

The criteria used were macroeconomic stability, political maturity, openness of trade and investment policies, and the quality of education. The N-11 paper is a follow-up to the bank's 2003 paper on the four emerging "BRIC" economies.

MIKT
In 2011, O'Neill coined the term MIKT (MIST is also used) for the countries of Mexico, Indonesia, South Korea, and Turkey. The term has largely fallen out of use, having been replaced by MINT (see below).

MINT
In 2013, O'Neill also coined the term MINT—Mexico, Indonesia, Nigeria, and Turkey—in order to differentiate among the variety of emerging economies. He plans to group this quartet as "growth markets" within the overall BRIC nations. In January 2014, O'Neill presented a four-part documentary series on this subject for BBC Radio entitled MINT: The Next Economic Giants.

Personal life
O'Neill grew up in Gatley and attended Burnage Comprehensive and Sheffield University, where he studied economics. O'Neill is an enthusiastic football fan and played for the Bank of America's first team in London. He is a lifelong follower of Manchester United F.C. and served as a non-executive director from 2004 to 2005, before the club was returned to private ownership.
On 2 March 2010, the Red Knights, a group of wealthy Manchester United fans believed to include O'Neill, confirmed interest in a possible takeover of the club.

See also
 BRIC
 Emerging and growth-leading economies (EAGLEs)
 Emerging markets
 Goldman Sachs
 MINT (economics)

References

External links

BBC Radio 4 - The New World - Fixing Globalisation - 6 January 2017 Jim O'Neill asks if new challenges mean an end to the era of globalisation
Centre for Rising Powers, University of Cambridge

1957 births
Alumni of the University of Sheffield
Alumni of the University of Surrey
English economists
Goldman Sachs people
Living people
Manchester United F.C. directors and chairmen
People from Cheadle, Greater Manchester
Conservative Party (UK) life peers
Life peers created by Elizabeth II
British Eurosceptics